The Pittsfield Suns are a summer collegiate baseball team based in Pittsfield, Massachusetts, USA, that plays in the Futures Collegiate Baseball League (FCBL) of New England.  The team's home games are played at Wahconah Park in Pittsfield.

Team history
The general manager of the Colonials, Jamie Keefe, was named as the first general manager of the new FCBL franchise, which began play in the 2012 FCBL season.  Keefe was previously named the Can-Am League's Manager of the Year in 2011.

Postseason Appearances

FCBL

2013 Old Orchard Beach Raging Tide (L) 0-1
2014 Brockton Rox (W) 8-3, Worcester Bravehearts (L) 0-2
2021 Defeated the Brockton Rox two games to one.
2021 Lost to the Vermont Lake Monsters two games to one in championship series.

 *The FCBL changed its postseason to a two-round format starting in the 2012 season
 ** A one-game Play-In round was added in the 2013 season

References

External links
 Official website of the Pittsfield Suns

Futures Collegiate Baseball League teams
Amateur baseball teams in Massachusetts
Baseball teams in Pittsfield, Massachusetts
2012 establishments in Massachusetts
Baseball teams established in 2012